Double Happiness II is a Chinese drama serial on MediaCorp Channel 8 in Singapore which was screened in 2004 and ended in Jan 2005. It consists two parts, with 71 episodes in this part of the show. It is about a family who sells fish and chips in a renowned restaurant in East Coast Road called Happy Fish. It stars Ivy Lee , Xie Shaoguang , Edmund Chen , Vivian Lai & Zhang Wei as the casts for the second installment. The restaurant has its ups and downs, but eventually it will come out strong, but not without tragedies and lessons learned. It is the sequel to Double Happiness.

In 2007 MediaCorp sold its rights to Chinese broadcaster CCTV8 and it was broadcast in China in 5 parts. It also had a rerun on Channel 8 in 2010 on weekdays at 4.00am, 2013 on weekdays at 5.30pm and the latest in 2020 on weekends at 7.30am.

Cast
Ivy Lee as Situ Yaxi
Xie Shaoguang as Luo Jialong
Patricia Mok as Su Meili, Jialong's wife
Xiang Yun as Luo Jiaxi
Huang Yiliang as Lin Xuezhi, Jiaxi's husband
Li Xianmin as Lin Wenwen, Jiaxi and Xuezhi's daughter
Aileen Tan as Luo Jiayu
Rayson Tan as Huang Yaozu, Jiayu's husband
Kimberly Wang as Lana, Yaozu and Jiayu's daughter
Clarence Neo Jia Jun as Patrick, Yaozu and Jiayu's son
Vivian Lai as Luo Jiaqian
Edmund Chen as Luo Jiaqi
Alan Tern as Wenjie/Wenxiong (Dual Role)
Priscelia Chan as Lin Meijiao, later Shirley
Jin Yinji as Mrs. Luo/Ah Feng (Dual Role)
Zhang Wei as Luo Kaijin
Hong Huifang as Luo Kaiyin, Kaijin's younger sister
Henry Thia as Gao Ah Peng, Meijiao's former husband
Jeff Wang as Luo Jiafu
Chen Tianwen as William
San Yow as Tang Jiaming

Guest cast
Moses Lim
Brandon Wong

Accolades

See also
List of MediaCorp Channel 8 Chinese drama series (2000s).
 Double Happiness (TV series)

References

External links
Double Happiness (Chinese)

Singapore Chinese dramas
2004 Singaporean television series debuts
2005 Singaporean television series endings
2000s Singaporean television series
2004 Singaporean television seasons
2005 Singaporean television seasons
Channel 8 (Singapore) original programming